The hoochie coochie is a catch-all term to describe several sexually provocative belly dance-like dances from the mid-to late 1800s. Also spelled hootchy-kootchy and a number of other variations, it is often associated with "The Streets of Cairo, or the Poor Little Country Maid" song, also known as "the snake charmer song". "Hoochie Coochie Man" (originally titled "I'm Your Hoochie Cooche Man") is also a blues standard written by Willie Dixon and first recorded by Muddy Waters in Chicago, January 7, 1954. Numerous cover versions of this classic continue to be recorded. Hoochie Coochie is also mentioned in Alan Jackson's hit country music song "Chattahoochee", and the Jerry Leiber and Mike Stoller songs "Little Egypt (Ying-Yang)" and "Saved" (sung by LaVern Baker).

Overview
Such dances, or something similar, were performed at the Crystal Palace Exhibition in London in 1851, the Centennial Exhibition in Philadelphia in 1876, and the World's Fair in Paris in 1889.  Although such dances became wildly popular in the United States during the Chicago World's Fair in 1893, there is no evidence of them being known by the name, "Coochie Coochie" until about a year after the fair closed, and "Hoochie Coochie" about a year later.  Before, during and immediately after the fair, these dances were frequently called, "Mussel dance", "stomach dance", danse du ventre and sometimes, "Kouta Kouta".  The transition from "kouta kouta" to "coochie coochie", and later, "hoochie coochie", may have been influenced by the expressions, "hoochy, coochy, coochy", "kutchy, kutchy", or "kutchy, kutchy coo", which were found in popular song lyrics from the 1860s and the 1880s.

Described by the New York Journal in 1893 as "Neither dancing of the head nor the feet", it was a dance performed by women of, or presented as having, Middle-Eastern or Eastern European Gypsy heritage, often as part of traveling sideshows.

The hoochie coochie replaced the much older can-can as the ribald dance of choice in New York dance halls by the 1890s.

Since the dance was performed by women, female impersonators or drag queens, a goochie man, or hoochie coochie man, either watched them or ran the show.  Alternatively, from the directly sexual meaning of goochie goochie, he was successful with women. The dance was still popular at the Louisiana Purchase Exposition: the World's Fair of 1904, and is even mentioned in the song ‘’Meet Me in St. Louis, Louis,’’ but had all but disappeared by the Second World War.

Spelling variations

Pronounced  or  according to Webster's dictionary definition, the words can be found in literature with a number of alternate spellings:
 Hoochie – hootchy hootchey hootchie hoochy hoochey
 Coochie – kootchy kootchey kootchie koochy koochey, cootchy cootchey cootchie coochy coochey

References

Novelty and fad dances
Vaudeville
Dance in the United States